Lights On may refer to:

 "Lights On" (Katy B song), 2010
 "Lights On" (Wiley song), 2013
 "Lights On", a 2022 song by Hatchie
 "Lights On", a song by H.E.R. from the 2017 compilation album H.E.R.
 "Lights On", a song by Sean Paul from the 2014 album Full Frequency
 "Lights On", a song by Shawn Mendes from the 2016 album Illuminate
 "Lights On", a 2022 song by Yours Truly

See also
 
 Lights Off (disambiguation)
 Lights Out (disambiguation)